educarchile is a Chilean educational website owned by the Ministry of Education of Chile and Fundación Chile. educarchile was created in 2001, using as a basis two different projects from the Ministry of Education and Fundación Chile, and its purpose is "to be the great Internet educative center for teachers, students, families and education researchers."

References

External links
 educarchile 

Internet properties established in 2001
Chilean educational websites